820 Naval Air Squadron is a Royal Navy Fleet Air Arm carrier-based squadron flying the AgustaWestland Merlin HM2 in an Anti-Submarine role from RNAS Culdrose.

The Squadron was formed at RNAS Gosport on 3 April 1933 with the transferral of the Fairey III aircraft from 450 Flight and half of 445 Flight of the Fleet Air Arm of the Royal Navy.

History

Second World War
The squadron's first assignment on its formation was to carry out spotter-reconnaissance duties for the aircraft carrier . They were later re-equipped with Fairey Seals and Blackburn Sharks, eventually receiving Fairey Swordfish in autumn 1937. The squadron was reassigned in November the following year to the new aircraft carrier . The squadron operated from Ark Royal for the next three years, initially on anti-submarine duties, but later as surface search and torpedo-attack aircraft. The squadron went with Ark Royal to the Atlantic, and by April 1940 they were supporting Allied operations during the Norwegian campaign, where they bombed Vaernes airfield. After the withdrawal from Norway, Ark Royal and the squadron moved to the Mediterranean in June. Aircraft from 820 squadron were involved in attacking the French fleet at Mers-el-Kébir, and later the Battle of Dakar, as well as attacks at Cagliari. They were also active during the Battle of Cape Spartivento, as well as covering convoys to Malta.

820 Squadron's next major engagement was the hunt for the German battleship . Aircraft from the squadron were able to disable Bismarcks steering gear with a torpedo hit, allowing Bismarck to be engaged and sunk. In June 1941 the squadron left Ark Royal, and in November that year returned to Iceland aboard . The Swordfish were then replaced with Fairey Albacores. 820 Squadron then embarked aboard  in February 1942, and sailed with Formidable to serve in the Indian Ocean. The squadron was then active in the Battle of Madagascar, followed by Operation Torch, the Allied landings in North Africa. During these operations, aircraft from the squadron sank , which had earlier sunk the battleship . Formidable and the squadron remained in the Mediterranean to provide support for the Allied landings at Sicily and Salerno.

The squadron then returned to the UK in November 1943 and disbanded at RNAS Donibristle. The squadron was quickly reformed however, and equipped with 12 Fairey Barracudas was initially based at RNAS Lee-on-Solent as a torpedo bomber/reconnaissance squadron. The operations failed to cause significant damage to Tirpitz. The squadron was re-equipped with 21 Grumman Avengers in September 1944 and sailed with Indefatigable to the Far East in November. They sailed to Ceylon where 820 squadron joined No 2 Strike Wing, which also consisted of 849 Squadron. The Wing attacked the oil refineries at Palembang, Sumatra in January 1945 as part of Operation Meridian, following this up with later strikes on the Sakashima Gunto islands. As the war in the Pacific moved closer to Japan 820 Squadron was assigned to the 7th Carrier Air Group, and carried out a number of raids on Tokyo prior to VJ-Day. After the end of the war, Indefatigable remained in the Pacific for some time, finally returning to the UK in March 1946. 820 Squadron was then disbanded again.

Post war
The squadron was re-formed five years later in July 1951, this time flying the Fairey Firefly. The squadron was embarked alternately aboard the carriers  and  during 1952 and 1953, spending most of its time on exercises in the Mediterranean.

The squadron was re-formed in 1964, and equipped with the Westland Wessex HAS.1, with which they served as anti-submarine squadron aboard . They were upgraded to the Westland Wessex HAS.3 in May 1969, when they were transferred to the Tiger-class helicopter cruiser . They remained aboard Blake until her disposal in 1979, the squadron was then assigned to HMS Hermes for the first quarter of 1980. The squadrons aircraft had been upgraded with the Westland Sea King HAS.1 in December 1972, followed by the HAS.2 version and then the HS.Mk.5 in December 1980.

In April 1982 the squadron remained embarked for the Falklands War. During the conflict the squadron flew over 4700 hours, with Invincible spending 166 days continuously at sea, setting a world record for continuous carrier operations. They were re-equipped in February 1990 with the Sea King MK6 and on board Ark Royal were dispatched to the Eastern Mediterranean on 10 January 1991, with the intention of transiting the Suez Canal, so they would be in the Red Sea for Operation Granby – UK name for Desert Storm. However, the war started before they could transit the Suez Canal, and instead, Ark Royal, remained in the Eastern Mediterranean for the duration of the War. In January 1993, 820 were dispatched aboard  and
RFA Fort Grange to support the British forces in Bosnia as part of Operation Grapple. There the squadron was used to ferry men and supplies. 820 Squadron returned to Bosnia in 1994, this time aboard HMS Ark Royal. With the later decommissioning of Ark Royal, the squadron joined  and by 1996 was in the eastern Atlantic, followed by a round the world deployment in 1997.

With Illustrious in refit from 1998, 820 Squadron operated out of RNAS Culdrose on anti-submarine training exercises, followed with periods embarked on ships of the Royal Fleet Auxiliary. They rejoined Illustrious in 1999 and participated in relief operations in Mozambique, aboard , and for Operation Palliser in Sierra Leone. Further training periods followed, as well as a Search and Rescue effort in October 2004 to aid the stricken Canadian submarine , which had been disabled after suffering a fire and flooding off the west coast of Ireland.

Present day
The squadron continues to carry out exercises aboard Royal Navy and Royal Fleet Auxiliary vessels, as well as participating in military operations. It is based at RNAS Culdrose and operates the AgustaWestland Merlin HM.2. Training is performed by 824 NAS and front line duties are shared with 814 NAS. During 2014, 820 NAS was temporarily assigned to the Commando Helicopter Force until the two main troop carrying squadrons fully convert to the Merlin HC.4.
820 NAS is also known as the "Queen's squadron" and will be the main squadron to operate on the Queen Elizabeth class aircraft carrier.
 3 Merlins from 820 NAS were deployed off  as the UK's response towards the 2014 Ebola virus. 820 NAS will be permanently attached to HMS Queen Elizabeths air group. On 3 July 2017, a Merlin Mk.2 helicopter of 820 NAS became the first aircraft to land on HMS Queen Elizabeth, piloted by 26-year-old Lieutenant Luke Wraith from Yorkshire.

In 2020, 820 NAS assumed responsibility for all Merlin HM.2 operations from the Royal Navy's carriers, when it took over the Airborne Surveillance role from 849 NAS. This will see a number of its aircraft installed with the Crowsnest system, consisting of a new version of the Searchwater radar combined with Cerberus mission system in a kit installation. This is to allow the system to be installed in any Merlin airframe.

Aircraft operated

Battle honours 
820 Naval Air Squadron has received the following battle honours.

 Norway 1940–41
 Spartivento 1940
 'Bismarck' 1941
 Atlantic 1941
 Malta Convoys 1941
 North Africa 1942–43
 Sicily 1943
 Salerno 1943
 Palembang 1945
 Okinawa 1945
 Japan 1945
 Falkland Islands 1982

References

Citations

Bibliography

 Fletcher, R.G. Front Line Avenger Squadrons of the FAA. Bury St. Edmunds, Suffolk, UK: R.G. Fletcher, 1995. .
 Sturtivant, Ray & Theo Ballance. The Squadrons of the Fleet Air Arm. Tonbridge, Kent, UK: Air Britain (Historians) Ltd, 2016. .

External links

Royal Navy – 820 Squadron
 
 
 
 

Military units and formations established in 1933
820 Squadron
Military units and formations of the Royal Navy in World War II
Military units and formations of the United Kingdom in the Falklands War
Military of the United Kingdom in Cornwall